Hüma Hatun ("bird of paradise/phoenix"  1410 ‒ September 1449) was a consort of Ottoman Sultan Murad II and mother of Mehmed II.

Life
Although, some Turkish sources claim that she was of Turkish origin, Hüma Hatun was a slave girl of Christian origin, Nothing is known of her family background, apart from the fact that an Ottoman inscription (vakfiye) describes her as Hātun binti Abdullah (daughter of Abdullah); at that time, people who converted to Islam were given the name Abdullah meaning Servant of God, which is evidence of her non-Muslim origin. According to tradition, she was of Italian and/or Jewish origins and her original name was Stella or Ester. According to another theory, based on the fact that Mehmed II was fluent in the Balkan language, it was that she came from those areas and was Slavic or Serbian. Finally, a third theory says she was Greek. Her name, hüma, means "bird of paradise/phoenix", after the Persian legend. 

Hüma Hatun entered in Murad II's harem around 1424. By him she had firstly two daughters, Hatice Hatun and Fatma Hatun, and finally, on 30 March 1432, she gave birth to her only son, the future Sultan Mehmed the Conqueror. In 1438, Mehmed was circumcised along with his elder half-brother, Şehzade Alaeddin. When Mehmed was 11 years old, he was sent to Manisa as a prince governor. Hüma followed her son to Manisa.

In 1444, after the death of Mehmed's elder half-brother, Şehzade Alaeddin, who died in 1443, Mehmed was the only heir left to the throne. In that same year, Murad II abdicated the throne due to depression over the death of his son, Şehzade Alaeddin Ali Çelebi,  and retreated to Manisa.

Her son Şehzade Mehmed succeeded the throne as Mehmed II. She held the Vâlide Hatun position for two years. In 1446, Murad took over the throne again, and Hüma and her son returned to Bursa. However, Mehmed succeeded the throne in 1451, after the death of his father, but she never became a Valide Hatun as she died before the accession. She was not alive to see the conquest of Constantinople, which became the capital of Ottoman Empire for nearly five centuries, before the Empire was abolished in 1922 and Turkey was officially declared as a republic.

Death
She died in September 1449 in Bursa, two years before her son's second accession to the throne. Her tomb is located at the site known as "Hatuniye Kümbedi" (Hatuniye Tomb) to the east of Muradiye Complex, which was built by her son Mehmed. The quarter where her tomb lies has been known thus far as Hüma Hatun Quarter.

See also
List of consorts of the Ottoman sultans
List of mothers of the Ottoman sultans

References

Further reading
Leslie Peirce. (1993). The Imperial Harem: Women and Sovereignty in the Ottoman Empire, Oxford University Press,  (paperback).
Yavuz Bahadıroğlu. (2009). Resimli Osmanlı Tarihi, Nesil Yayınları (Illustrated Ottoman History, Nesil Publications), 15th ed.,  (Hardcover).
 Osmanlı Padişahlarının yabancı anneleri ve padişahların yabancılarla evlenme gerekçeleri. Cafrande Kültür Sanat ve Hayat. 13 March 2008. General Culture

External links

15th-century consorts of Ottoman sultans
1410 births
1449 deaths
People from the Ottoman Empire of Italian descent
People from the Ottoman Empire of Serbian descent
Valide sultan